Justice Kelly may refer to:

 Fallon Kelly, associate justice of the Minnesota Supreme Court
 Harry Kelly (politician), associate justice of the Michigan Supreme Court
 James K. Kelly, chief justice of the Oregon Supreme Court
 Joseph Luther Kelly (1867–1925), associate justice of the Supreme Court of Appeals of Virginia
 Marilyn Jean Kelly, associate justice of the Michigan Supreme Court
 Mary Beth Kelly, associate justice of the Michigan Supreme Court
 Percy R. Kelly, chief justice of the Oregon Supreme Court

See also
 Glenn E. Kelley, associate justice of the Minnesota Supreme Court